Lohagaon (Lohagāva) is a neighbourhood in northeast Pune, India. There is a grand temple of Shri Sant Tukaram Maharaj in Lohagaon. A big kirtan festival is celebrated every year and a big fair is held. Shiva Jayanti is also celebrated on a large scale every year.

Lohagaon is primarily known for the Pune Airport, a customs airport. It comes under Pune Municipal Corporation. It also has an Indian Air Force Base, which houses the 2 Wing, IAF. Established in 1939, it is one of the oldest air bases in India, after the Ambala Air Base. Many ex-servicemen from different regions of India reside in parts of Lohagaon. The area has grown hugely in this decade as a residential area due to the development of IT Parks in adjoining Viman Nagar. Lohegaon has relatively less buildings and tall structures compared to nearby areas due to its proximity to the airport.

History 
The oldest known available surviving map which shows Lohagaon as a prominent village near Pune in the Maratha Empire was drawn in the year 1793 by William Faden. Hence the original village of Lohagaon is believed to have existed from much before.

The Airforce Base goes back to the Second World War when the defence of Bombay city and protection of other areas adjoining the city became very vital. The Air Force base was established at Lohegaon to meet these objectives in 1939 as an RIAF base and since then it has been one of the premier air bases in the country. An RIAF Squadron with Mosquito, Willington and Spitfire aircraft moved to this air base in 1939. Gp Capt R Hamildon, DFC was the last British Station Commander of this base. The first Indian Commanding Officer, Wg Cdr HS Ratnagar took over the base on 21 May 47. This base is one of the few bases from where the most variety of aircraft took to the skies and were inducted into the Indian Air Force. Several newly inducted aircraft have taken to the skies from this base. All the aircraft on the inventory of Indian Air Force since Independence have taken to the skies from the Lohegaon Air Base. During 1965 and 1971 Indo-Pakistani Wars this base was utilised as a staging base for fighter and bomber operations.

Name 
It was referred to as many different spellings and names in various sources. European Maps from 1793 and 1800 referred to the village as 'Logom' (which is a mistake in Anglicisation of Lohagaon), whereas later British and Indian sources referred to as 'Lohogaon', 'Lohegaon', and 'Lohagaon'.

It is difficult even today to determine which English name is correct and accepted by everyone as various transliterations to English can sound exactly the same as its Marathi counterpart.

Some official sources today refer to it as 'Lohegaon', including the Indian Air Force; whereas some write it 'Lohagaon' and others write it as 'Lohgaon'.

Demographics

Language and ethnicity
The official language of Lohagaon is Marathi, and it is also the majority language of the area. Due to the presence of ex-servicemen and professionals originating from different regions of India and their families living in some parts of Lohagaon, the area is diverse and has sizable communities of people who speak different languages like Hindi, Punjabi, Bengali, Telugu, etc, as their first language. This has also led to increase in ethnic diversity in the area and people belonging to these communities are able to celebrate their regional festivals.

Religion
The majority population of the area follows Hinduism with the presence of Sikhs, Muslims, and Christians, which is clearly evident from the presence of Temples, Gurudwara and a few Churches in the area.

There are many temples in Lohagaon with the most notable ones being the Shree Sant Tukaram Temple (in the heart of Lohagaon) and the Khandoba Temple (on top of the Khandoba Mal) and many others. Lohagaon also has dozens of local smaller temples which are lesser known about.

Literacy
The literacy rate of Lohagaon was 91.34% according to the Indian Census of 2011, which is much higher than both the state and the national average. The male literacy stood at 94.73% while female literacy rate stood at a little less, at 87.34%.

Sex ratio
The sex ratio stood at 856, which is much lower than the State Average of 929. Whereas, the child sex ratio was higher than the state average of 894, and stood at 912.

Children under the age of 7 years comprised over 12.27% of the population of Lohagaon in 2011.

Location and connectivity
Lohagaon lies between Vishrantwadi, Viman Nagar, Wagholi and Vadgaon Shinde.

There is a road which connects Lohagaon and Wagholi, which in turn connects to the Ahmednagar Highway. Roads from Vishrantwadi, Dhanori, Vadgaon Sheri and Wagholi all converge at Lohagaon.  Lohagaon also has good road connectivity to Alandi road, and hence to areas such as Chakan, Moshi and Nashik Road. This area has a mix of cityside and countryside.

Lohagaon has many bus stops, from which commuters can avail Public Transport Buses. Currently there is no other form of public transport connecting the area. Auto Rickshaws and Cabs are available as a means of transport.

Schools
Due to the presence of an Indian Air Force Base, there is a Kendriya Vidyalaya, namely Kendriya Vidyalaya No. 1 AFS, Pune in the area. Most of the students in these schools are children of serving and retired defense personnel staying in parts of Lohagaon.

Other prominent schools include the Government School and many other smaller private schools affiliated to different boards and curricula.

Entertainment

Diamond Water Park 
The Diamond Park, Spread over 25 acres, it was known as the first and largest water park in Pune when founded. In 2006, it was renamed as Diamond Water Park. The park was remodelled by Arjun Indulkar. The rides are designed to suit the varied needs of people of varied age groups. It offers rock climbing and a zipline. The Diamond Waterpark consists of wet bubble, cyclone, play station, Tortuga falls, seven swimming pools, and 32 international rides. There is a pure vegetarian restaurant inside the water park.

University 
Lohagaon is home to Ajeenkya DY Patil University and Marathwada Mitramandal's Institute of Technology.

References 

Neighbourhoods in Pune